Lyman may refer to:

Places

Ukraine
 Lyman, Ukraine

United States
 Lyman, Iowa
 Lyman, Maine
 Lyman, Mississippi
 Lyman, Nebraska
 Lyman, New Hampshire
 Lyman, Oklahoma
 Lyman, South Carolina
 Lyman, South Dakota
 Lyman County, South Dakota
 Lyman, Utah
 Lyman, Washington
 Lyman, Wyoming

Other uses
 Lyman (crater), a lunar impact crater
 Lyman (name)
 Lyman series of hydrogen spectral lines

See also
 Liman (disambiguation)
 Lyman High School (disambiguation)